Aasai is a 1956 Indian Tamil-language film, produced and directed by M. Natesan. The dialogues were written by Ilangovan, K. V. Gnanasambantham and Ve. Laxmanan and the story was written by M. Natesan. The film stars Gemini Ganesan and Padmini.

Plot

Cast 

Male cast
 Gemini Ganesan as Sekhar
 N. S. Krishnan as Jakkan
 V. Nagayya as Sadhanandham
 D. Balasubramaniam as Nithyanandham
 P. S. Veerappa as Veeran
 Thirupathisami as Singaram
 Sethupathi as Masi
 V. P. Balaraman as Stunts
 Krishnan as Stunts

Female cast
 Padmini as Sundari
 Rajam Sulochana as Valli
 T. A. Mathuram as Chokki
 P. Santha Kumari as Amrtham
 M. R. Santhanalakshmi as Anjuham
 T. S. Jaya as Kathayi
 Baby Parvathi as Selvi
 Rita, Shantha, Saraswathi

Soundtrack 
Music was by T. R. Pappa and lyrics were written by Udumalai Narayana Kavi, A. Maruthakasi and K. P. Kamakshisundaram.

Reception 
Kalki wrote .

References

External links 
 

1950s Tamil-language films
1956 films
Films scored by T. R. Pappa
Indian black-and-white films